Lazulite is a blue, phosphate mineral containing magnesium, iron, and aluminium phosphate. Lazulite forms one endmember of a solid solution series with the darker iron rich scorzalite.

Lazulite crystallizes in the monoclinic system. Crystal habits include steep bipyramidal or wedge-shaped crystals.  Lazulite has a Mohs hardness of 5.5 to 6 and a specific gravity of 3.0 to 3.1. It is infusible and insoluble.

Occurrence and discovery

It forms by high grade metamorphism of high silica quartz rich rocks and in pegmatites. It occurs in
association with quartz, andalusite, rutile, kyanite, corundum, muscovite, pyrophyllite,
dumortierite, wagnerite, svanbergite and berlinite in metamorphic terrains; and with albite, quartz, muscovite, tourmaline and beryl in pegmatites.
It may be confused with lazurite, lapis lazuli or azurite.

The type locality is in Freßnitzgraben in Krieglach, it's also found in Salzburg, Austria; Zermatt, Switzerland; Minas Gerais, Brazil; Lincoln County, Georgia; Inyo County, California; the Yukon in Canada; and elsewhere.

It was first described in 1795 for deposits in Styria, Austria. Its name comes from the German , for 'blue stone' or from the Arabic for heaven.

References

Aluminium minerals
Iron(II) minerals
Magnesium minerals
Phosphate minerals
Monoclinic minerals
Minerals in space group 14